George Joseph Radachowsky Jr. (born September 7, 1962) is a former American football strong safety who played five seasons in the National Football League (NFL) with the Indianapolis Colts and New York Jets. He was drafted by the Los Angeles Rams in the seventh round of the 1984 NFL Draft. He played college football at Boston College and attended Danbury High School in Danbury, Connecticut. Radachowsky also played baseball for the Boston College Eagles.

References

External links
Just Sports Stats
College stats

Living people
1962 births
Players of American football from Connecticut
American football defensive backs
Boston College Eagles football players
Boston College Eagles baseball players
Indianapolis Colts players
New York Jets players
Sportspeople from Danbury, Connecticut
National Football League replacement players
Danbury High School alumni